Goniophlebium formosanum is a species of fern in the family Polypodiaceae, found in Fujian (China), Japan and Taiwan. It is an epiphyte that grows on tree trunks or rocks, with straw-colored stipes, 15–20 cm in length, and oblong lamina approximately 30–50 × 10–15 cm in size.

References 

 Flora of China entry

Polypodiaceae
Flora of China
Flora of Taiwan
Plants described in 1885
Flora of Japan